The 1842 Newfoundland general election was held in 1842 to elect members of the 3rd General Assembly of Newfoundland in Newfoundland Colony. The elected assembly with 15 members and the appointed Legislative Council with 10 members were combined into a unicameral legislature.

Members of the House of Assembly 
 St. John's District
 Laurence O'Brien
 John Valentine Nugent
 William Carson (d. 1843)
 Robert John Parsons elected later
 Conception Bay District
 Thomas Ridley
 John Munn
 James Luke Prendergast
 Edmund Hanrahan
 Ferryland District
 Thomas Glen
 Placentia and St. Mary's District
 John Dillon
 Simon Morris
 Burin District
 Clement Benning
 Fortune Bay District
 Bryan Robinson
 Trinity Bay District
 Richard Barnes
 Bonavista Bay District
 Robert Carter Conservative
 Fogo District
 John Slade elected later

Members of the Legislative Council 
 James Simms Attorney General
 James Crowdy Colonial Secretary
 John Dunscombe
 William Thomas
 Patrick Morris Colonial Treasurer
 William Bickford Row
 James Tobin
 Joseph Noad Surveyor General
 Charles Fox Bennett
 John Kent

References 
 

1842
1842 elections in North America
1842 elections in Canada
Pre-Confederation Newfoundland
1842 in Newfoundland